Sinalco is a popular brand of non-alcoholic drinks first marketed in 1902, with sales in now more than 40 countries. Sinalco is the oldest soft drink brand in Europe. It is produced by Sinalco International, a company headquartered in Detmold, Germany.

In 1902, German scientist Friedrich Eduard Bilz invented "Bilz Brause", a sherbet powder, and started to sell it in partnership with industrialist Franz Hartmann. As imitations started to appear, they held a prize competition for a brand name, and chose "Sinalco" (an abbreviation of the Latin sine alcohole, "without alcohol"). As one of the first beverage brands, Sinalco came to be exported worldwide, particularly to South America and the Middle East. The red circle trademark was registered in 1937. A distinctively-shaped bottle was launched in the 1950s, and updated at the end of the century. Besides the original Sinalco Orange, today the company also bottles Sinalco Cola and a few other kinds of soft drinks. In Germany, it is the third most popular soft drink, after Fanta and Sprite.

In Slovenia Sinalco soft drinks are produced by food tech company Dana, licensed by Sinalco International GmbH & Co.

Products
Sinalco's basic line of products includes:

Sinalco Cola
Sinalco Orange
Sinalco Zitron
Sinalco Bitter Lemon
Sinalco Lemon Lime
Sinalco Cloudy Lemon
Sinalco Special
Sinalco Apple
Sinalco Rosso (Blood Orange and Passion fruit)
Sinalco Fresco (Lemon and Elderberry)
Sinalco Caribico

In addition, Sinalco bottles energy drinks, teas, and water.

References

External links
 

Soft drinks
Products introduced in 1902
Drink brands
German brands
German drinks